Everybody Hates Chris is an American television period sitcom. Inspired by the teenage years of comedian Chris Rock, the show is set from 1982 to 1987. The show was created by Rock and Ali LeRoi. It debuted on UPN on September 22, 2005. The following year, UPN merged with The WB to form The CW, where the sitcom aired for its remaining three seasons. Its final episode aired on May 8, 2009.

During its run, the series was nominated for numerous awards including a Golden Globe Award, three Emmy Awards, a People's Choice Award, and a Writers Guild of America Award. The series won NAACP Image Awards for outstanding actor, actress, and writing in a comedy series.

References

Everybody Hates Chris